Shrewsbury Township, Pennsylvania may refer to:
Shrewsbury Township, Lycoming County, Pennsylvania
Shrewsbury Township, Sullivan County, Pennsylvania
Shrewsbury Township, York County, Pennsylvania

Pennsylvania township disambiguation pages